ANSI escape sequences are a standard for in-band signaling to control cursor location, color, font styling, and other options on video text terminals and terminal emulators. Certain sequences of bytes, most starting with an ASCII escape character and a bracket character, are embedded into text.  The terminal interprets these sequences as commands, rather than text to display verbatim.

ANSI sequences were introduced in the 1970s to replace vendor-specific sequences and became widespread in the computer equipment market by the early 1980s. They are used in development, scientific, commercial text-based applications as well as bulletin board systems to offer standardized functionality.

Although hardware text terminals have become increasingly rare in the 21st century, the relevance of the ANSI standard persists because a great majority of terminal emulators and command consoles interpret at least a portion of the ANSI standard.

History 
Almost all manufacturers of video terminals added vendor-specific escape sequences to perform operations such as placing the cursor at arbitrary positions on the screen. One example is the VT52 terminal, which allowed the cursor to be placed at an x,y location on the screen by sending the  character, a  character, and then two characters representing numerical values equal to the x,y location plus 32 (thus starting at the ASCII space character and avoiding the control characters). The Hazeltine 1500 had a similar feature, invoked using ,  and then the X and Y positions separated with a comma. While the two terminals had identical functionality in this regard, different control sequences had to be used to invoke them.

As these sequences were different for different terminals, elaborate libraries such as termcap ("terminal capabilities") and utilities such as tput had to be created so programs could use the same API to work with any terminal. In addition, many of these terminals required sending numbers (such as row and column) as the binary values of the characters; for some programming languages, and for systems that did not use ASCII internally, it was often difficult to turn a number into the correct character.

The ANSI standard attempted to address these problems by making a command set that all terminals would use and requiring all numeric information to be transmitted as ASCII numbers. The first standard in the series was ECMA-48, adopted in 1976. It was a continuation of a series of character coding standards, the first one being ECMA-6 from 1965, a 7-bit standard from which ISO 646 originates. The name "ANSI escape sequence" dates from 1979 when ANSI adopted ANSI X3.64.  The ANSI X3L2 committee collaborated with the ECMA committee TC 1 to produce nearly identical standards. These two standards were merged into an international standard, ISO 6429. In 1994, ANSI withdrew its standard in favor of the international standard.

The first popular video terminal to support these sequences was the Digital VT100, introduced in 1978. This model was very successful in the market, which sparked a variety of VT100 clones, among the earliest and most popular of which was the much more affordable Zenith Z-19 in 1979.  Others included the Qume QVT-108, Televideo TVI-970, Wyse WY-99GT as well as optional "VT100" or "VT103" or "ANSI" modes with varying degrees of compatibility on many other brands. The popularity of these gradually led to more and more software (especially bulletin board systems and other online services) assuming the escape sequences worked, leading to almost all new terminals and emulator programs supporting them.

In 1981, ANSI X3.64 was adopted for use in the US government by FIPS publication 86.  Later, the US government stopped duplicating industry standards, so FIPS pub. 86 was withdrawn.

ECMA-48 has been updated several times and is currently at its 5th edition, from 1991. It is also adopted by ISO and IEC as standard ISO/IEC 6429. A version is adopted as a Japanese Industrial Standard, as JIS X 0211.

Related standards include ITU T.61, the Teletex standard, and the ISO/IEC 8613, the Open Document Architecture standard (mainly ISO/IEC 8613-6 or ITU T.416). The two systems share many escape codes with the ANSI system, with extensions that are not necessarily meaningful to computer terminals. Both systems quickly fell into disuse, but ECMA-48 does mark the extensions used in them as reserved.

Platform support

Unix-like systems 

On these systems the terminal (or emulator) self-identifies using the $TERM environment variable. A database library such as termcap or terminfo would perform a lookup to derive the capabilities of the terminal and specific escape sequences to use the capabilities, which may deviate from ANSI in early days.

Although such libraries were primarily developed on and for Unix, by the mid-1980s programs running on Unix-like operating systems could almost always assume they were using a terminal or emulator that supported ANSI sequences; this led to widespread use of ANSI by programs running on those platforms. For instance, many games and shell scripts, and utilities such as color directory listings, directly write the ANSI sequences and thus cannot be used on a terminal that does not interpret them. Many programs, including text editors such as vi and GNU Emacs, use termcap or terminfo, or use libraries such as curses that use termcap or terminfo, and thus in theory support non-ANSI terminals, but this is so rarely tested nowadays that they are unlikely to work with those terminals.

Terminal emulators for communicating with local programs as well as remote machines and the text system console almost always support ANSI escape codes. This includes terminal emulators such as xterm, rxvt, GNOME Terminal, and Konsole on systems with X11-based or Wayland-based window systems, and Terminal.app and third-party terminal emulators such as iTerm2 on macOS.

CP/M 

CP/M machines varied and several competing terminals existed, like for printers, each with their own control sequences.  Some early systems were headless (needing an external terminal) and personal computers with a native screen typically emulated a terminal.  Application developers had to support various popular terminals and to provide an installation program to configure them.  Despite the CP/M hardware abstraction layer (BIOS), even for the same microprocessor, vendors provided platform-specific versions due to the competing disk formats, that would also be preconfigured for the native terminal (for example, various machine-specific WordStar adaptations were released).

The headless Altair 8800 was typically connected to a teletype such as the Model 33 ASR or to an external terminal like the TeleVideo 920C, needing to output their respective sequences.  The Osborne 1 and Kaypro II computers natively emulated a subset of the TeleVideo 920C and ADM-3A control codes, respectively.  The TRS-80 Model 4 and the Xerox 820 also emulated the Lear Siegler ADM-3A.  The Zenith Z-89, Heathkit H8 and Amstrad PCW CP/M-80 computers implemented the Zenith Z19 (Heathkit H19) terminal codes, mostly compatible with VT52, the Z-89 manual also describes it as supporting ANSI.

The Microsoft Z-80 SoftCard for the Apple II emulated a limited subset of the Videx Videoterm, corresponding to the Datamedia 1520 sequences that the UCSD-based Apple Pascal supported.  Its CP/M had the CONFIGIO command to adapt external terminals or run local applications that issued other control codes.  Supported external terminals were the Soroc IQ 120/140 and Hazeltine 1500/1510.

DOS, OS/2, and Windows 
MS-DOS 1.x did not support the ANSI or any other escape sequences. Only a few control characters (BEL, CR, LF, BS) were interpreted by the underlying BIOS, making it almost impossible to do any kind of full-screen application. Any display effects had to be done with BIOS calls, which were notoriously slow, or by directly manipulating the IBM PC hardware.

Slowness and the fact that it was not installed by default made software rarely take advantage of it; instead, applications continued to directly manipulate the hardware to get the text display needed. ANSI.SYS and similar drivers continued to work in Windows 9x up to Windows Me, and in NT-derived systems for 16-bit legacy programs executing under the NTVDM.

Many clones of DOS were able to interpret the sequences and do not require a separate ANSI driver to be loaded. PTS-DOS as well as Concurrent DOS, Multiuser DOS and REAL/32 have built-in support (plus a number of extensions). OS/2 had an  command that enabled the sequences.

The Windows Console did not support ANSI escape sequences, nor did Microsoft provide any method to enable them. Some replacements or additions for the console window such as JP Software's TCC (formerly 4NT), Michael J. Mefford's ANSI.COM, Jason Hood's  and Maximus5's ConEmu interpreted ANSI escape sequences printed by programs. A Python package named colorama   internally interpretes ANSI escape sequences in text being printed, translating them to win32 calls to modify the state of the terminal, to make it easier to port Python code using ANSI to Windows.

In 2016, Microsoft released the Windows 10 version 1511 update which unexpectedly implemented support for ANSI escape sequences, over two decades after the debut of Windows NT. This was done alongside Windows Subsystem for Linux, allowing Unix-like terminal-based software to use the sequences in Windows Console. This defaults to off, but Windows PowerShell 5.1 enabled it.

Windows Terminal, introduced in 2019, supports the sequences by default, and Microsoft intends to replace the Windows Console with Windows Terminal.

Atari ST/TT/Falcon series 
Atari TOS used the command system adapted from the VT52 with some expansions for color support, rather than supporting ANSI escape codes.

AmigaOS 
AmigaOS not only interprets ANSI code sequences for text output to the screen, the AmigaOS printer driver also interprets them (with extensions proprietary to AmigaOS) and translates them into the codes required for the particular printer that is actually attached.

VMS / OpenVMS 
VMS was designed to be controlled using Digital's text-based video terminals such as the aforementioned VT100; thus software tends to write the ANSI escape sequences directly (and will not work on non-ANSI terminals).

Description

C0 control codes 
Almost all users assume some functions of some single-byte characters. Initially defined as part of ASCII, the default C0 control code set is now defined in ISO 6429 (ECMA-48), making it part of the same standard as the C1 set invoked by the ANSI escape sequences (although ISO 2022 allows the ISO 6429 C0 set to be used without the ISO 6429 C1 set, and vice versa, provided that 0x1B is always ESC). This is used to shorten the amount of data transmitted, or to perform some functions that are unavailable from escape sequences:

Escape sequences vary in length. The general format for an ANSI-compliant escape sequence is defined by ANSI X3.41 (equivalent to ECMA-35 or ISO/IEC 2022). The escape sequences consist only of bytes in the range  (all the non-control ASCII characters), and can be parsed without looking ahead. The behavior when a control character, a byte with the high bit set, or a byte that is not part of any valid sequence, is encountered before the end is undefined.

Fe Escape sequences 

Its interpretation is delegated to the applicable C1 control code standard. Accordingly, all escape sequences corresponding to C1 control codes from ANSI X3.64 / ECMA-48 follow this format.

The standard says that, in 8-bit environments, the control functions corresponding to type  escape sequences (those from the set of C1 control codes) can be represented as single bytes in the 0x80–0x9F range. This is possible in character encodings conforming to the provisions for an 8-bit code made in ISO 2022, such as the ISO 8859 series. However, in character encodings used on modern devices such as UTF-8 or CP-1252, those codes are often used for other purposes, so only the 2-byte sequence is typically used. In the case of UTF-8, representing a C1 control code via the C1 Controls and Latin-1 Supplement block results in a different two-byte code (e.g.  for ), but no space is saved this way.

CSI (Control Sequence Introducer) sequences 

A subset of arrangements was declared "private" so that terminal manufacturers could insert their own sequences without conflicting with the standard. Sequences containing the parameter bytes <=>? or the final bytes 0x70–0x7E (p–z{|}~) are private.

The behavior of the terminal is undefined in the case where a CSI sequence contains any character outside of the range 0x20–0x7E. These illegal characters are either C0 control characters (the range 0–0x1F), DEL (0x7F), or bytes with the high bit set. Possible responses are to ignore the byte, to process it immediately, and furthermore whether to continue with the CSI sequence, to abort it immediately, or to ignore the rest of it.

SGR (Select Graphic Rendition) parameters 
The control sequence CSI  m, named Select Graphic Rendition (SGR), sets display attributes. Several attributes can be set in the same sequence, separated by semicolons. Each display attribute remains in effect until a following occurrence of SGR resets it.

Colors

3-bit and 4-bit 

The original specification only had 8 colors, and just gave them names. The SGR parameters 30–37 selected the foreground color, while 40–47 selected the background. Quite a few terminals implemented "bold" (SGR code 1) as a brighter color rather than a different font, thus providing 8 additional foreground colors. Usually you could not get these as background colors, though sometimes inverse video (SGR code 7) would allow that. Examples: to get black letters on white background use , to get red use , to get bright red use . Later terminals added the ability to directly specify the "bright" colors with 90–97 and 100–107.

When hardware started using 8-bit digital-to-analog converters (DACs) several pieces of software assigned 24-bit color numbers to these names. The chart below shows the default values sent to the DAC for some common hardware and software; in most cases they are configurable.

8-bit 
As 256-color lookup tables became common on graphic cards, escape sequences were added to select from a pre-defined set of 256 colors:
 ESC[38;5;m Select foreground color      where n is a number from the table below
 ESC[48;5;m Select background color
   0-  7:  standard colors (as in ESC [ 30–37 m)
  16-231:  6 × 6 × 6 cube (216 colors): 16 + 36 × r + 6 × g + b (0 ≤ r, g, b ≤ 5)
 232-255:  grayscale from dark to light in 24 steps

The ITU's T.416 Information technology - Open Document Architecture (ODA) and interchange format: Character content architectures uses ":" as separator characters instead:
 ESC[38:5:m Select foreground color      where n is a number from the table below
 ESC[48:5:m Select background color

Not much is known about the scheme besides the color codes. It uses a 4×4×4 color cube.

24-bit 

As "true color" graphic cards with 16 to 24 bits of color became common, applications began to support 24-bit colors. Terminal emulators supporting setting 24-bit foreground and background colors with escape sequences include Xterm, KDE's Konsole, and iTerm, as well as all libvte based terminals, including GNOME Terminal. 
 ESC[38;2;;; m Select RGB foreground color
 ESC[48;2;;; m Select RGB background color

The syntax is likely based on the ITU's T.416 Open Document Architecture (ODA) and interchange format: Character content architectures, which was adopted as ISO/IEC 8613-6 but ended up as a commercial failure. The ODA version is more elaborate and thus incompatible:
 The parameters after the '2' (r, g, and b) are optional and can be left empty.
 Semicolons are replaced by colons, as above. 
 There is a leading "colorspace ID". The definition of the colorspace ID is not included in that document so it may be blank to represent the unspecified default.
 In addition to the '2' value after 48 to specify a Red-Green-Blue format (and the '5' above for a 0-255 indexed color), there are alternatives of '0' for implementation-defined and '1' for transparent - neither of which have any further parameters; '3' specifies colors using a Cyan-Magenta-Yellow scheme, and '4' for a Cyan-Magenta-Yellow-Black one, the latter using the position marked as "unused" for the Black component:
 ESC[38:2::::::: m Select RGB foreground color
 ESC[48:2::::::: m Select RGB background color

The ITU-RGB variation is supported by xterm, with the colorspace ID and tolerance parameters ignored. The simpler scheme using semicolons is initially found in Konsole.

Unix environment variables relating to color support 

Before termcap and terminfo could indicate support for colors, the S-Lang library used  to indicate whether a terminal emulator could use colors at all (later reinterpreted as 256-colors) and whether it supports 24-bit color. This system, although poorly documented, became widespread enough for Fedora and RHEL to consider using it as a simpler and more universal detection mechanism compared to querying the now-updated libraries. However, gnome-terminal 3.14 dropped this variable as its authors considered it incorrect and no longer necessary.

Some terminal emulators (urxvt, konsole) set  to report the color scheme of the terminal (mainly light vs. dark background). This behavior originated in S-Lang and is used by vim. Again, gnome-terminal refuses to add this behavior, as the more "proper" xterm OSC 4/10/11 sequences already exist.

OSC (Operating System Command) sequences 

Most Operating System Command sequences were defined by Xterm, but many are also supported by other terminal emulators.

A non-xterm extension is the hyperlink,  from 2017, used by VTE, iTerm2, and mintty.

The Linux console uses  to change the palette, which, if hard-coded into an application, may hang other terminals. However, appending  will be ignored by Linux and form a proper, ignorable sequence for other terminals.

Fs Escape sequences 

This type is used for control functions individually registered with the ISO-IR registry and, consequently, available even in contexts where a different C1 control code set is used. Specifically, they correspond to single control functions approved by ISO/IEC JTC 1/SC 2 and standardized by ISO or an ISO-recognised body. Some of these are specified in ECMA-35 (ISO 2022 / ANSI X3.41), others in ECMA-48 (ISO 6429 / ANSI X3.64). ECMA-48 refers to these as "independent control functions".

Fp Escape sequences 

nF Escape sequences 

Said byte is followed by any number of additional bytes in this range, and then a byte in the range . These escape sequences are further subcategorised by the low four bits of the first byte, e.g. "type ") or not (e.g. "type ").

Escape sequences of this type are mostly used for ANSI/ISO code-switching mechanisms such as those used by ISO-2022-JP, except for type  sequences (those where the first intermediate byte is ), which are used for individual control functions. Type  sequences are reserved for additional ISO-IR registered individual control functions, while type  sequences are available for private-use control functions. Unlike type  sequences, no type  sequences are presently registered.

Examples 
 — This clears the screen and, on some devices, locates the cursor to the y,x position 1,1 (upper left corner).

 — This makes text green. Some implementations use the Bold state to make the character Bright.

 — This reassigns the key F10 to send to the keyboard buffer the string "DIR" and ENTER, which in the DOS command line would display the contents of the current directory. (MS-DOS ANSI.SYS only) This was sometimes used for ANSI bombs.  This is a private-use code (as indicated by the letter p), using a non-standard extension to include a string-valued parameter.  Following the letter of the standard would consider the sequence to end at the letter D.

 — This saves the cursor position. Using the sequence  will restore it to the position. Say the current cursor position is 7(y) and 10(x). The sequence  will save those two numbers. Now if you use the sequence CSI u the cursor position will return to 7(y) and 10(x). Some terminals require the DEC sequences  /  instead which is more widely supported.

In shell scripting 

ANSI escape codes are often used in UNIX and UNIX-like terminals to provide syntax highlighting. For example, on compatible terminals, the following list command color-codes file and directory names by type.

Users can employ escape codes in their scripts by including them as part of standard output or standard error. For example, the following GNU sed command embellishes the output of the make command by displaying lines containing words starting with "WARN" in reverse video and words starting with "ERR" in bright yellow on a dark red background (letter case is ignored). The representations of the codes are highlighted.
 make 2>&1 | sed -e 's/.*\bWARN.*/\x1b[7m&\x1b[0m/i' -e 's/.*\bERR.*/\x1b[93;41m&\x1b[0m/i'

The following Bash function flashes the terminal (by alternately sending reverse and normal video mode codes) until the user presses a key.
  \\e[?5h \\e[?5l
 
This will reset the console, similar to the command  on modern Linux systems; however it should work even on older Linux systems and on other (non-Linux) UNIX variants.

In C 
#include <stdio.h>

int main(void)
{
    int i, j, n;

    for (i = 0; i < 11; i++) {
        for (j = 0; j < 10; j++) {
            n = 10 * i + j;
            if (n > 108) break;
            printf("\033[%dm %3d\033[m", n, n);
        }
        printf("\n");
    }
    return 0;
}

Terminal input sequences 

Pressing special keys on the keyboard, as well as outputting many xterm CSI, DCS, or OSC sequences, often produces a CSI, DCS, or OSC sequence, sent from the terminal to the computer as though the user typed it.

When typing input on a terminal keypresses outside the normal main alphanumeric keyboard area can be sent to the host as ANSI sequences. For keys that have an equivalent output function, such as the cursor keys, these often mirror the output sequences. However, for most keypresses there isn't an equivalent output sequence to use.

There are several encoding schemes, and unfortunately most terminals mix sequences from different schemes, so host software has to be able to deal with input sequences using any scheme. 
To complicate the matter, the VT terminals themselves have two schemes of input, normal mode and application mode that can be switched by the application.

(draft section)
<char>                                         -> char
<esc> <nochar>                                 -> esc
<esc> <esc>                                    -> esc
<esc> <char>                                   -> Alt-keypress or keycode sequence
<esc> '[' <nochar>                             -> Alt-[
<esc> '[' (<modifier>) <char>                  -> keycode sequence, <modifier> is a decimal number and defaults to 1 (xterm)
<esc> '[' (<keycode>) (';'<modifier>) '~'      -> keycode sequence, <keycode> and <modifier> are decimal numbers and default to 1 (vt)

If the terminating character is '~', the first number must be present and is a
keycode number, the second number is an optional modifier value. If the terminating
character is a letter, the letter is the keycode value, and the optional number is
the modifier value.

The modifier value defaults to 1, and after subtracting 1 is a bitmap of modifier
keys being pressed: . So, for example, <esc>[4;2~ is

In other words, the modifier is the sum of the following numbers:

vt sequences:
<esc>[1~    - Home        <esc>[16~   -             <esc>[31~   - F17
<esc>[2~    - Insert      <esc>[17~   - F6          <esc>[32~   - F18
<esc>[3~    - Delete      <esc>[18~   - F7          <esc>[33~   - F19
<esc>[4~    - End         <esc>[19~   - F8          <esc>[34~   - F20
<esc>[5~    - PgUp        <esc>[20~   - F9          <esc>[35~   - 
<esc>[6~    - PgDn        <esc>[21~   - F10         
<esc>[7~    - Home        <esc>[22~   -             
<esc>[8~    - End         <esc>[23~   - F11         
<esc>[9~    -             <esc>[24~   - F12         
<esc>[10~   - F0          <esc>[25~   - F13         
<esc>[11~   - F1          <esc>[26~   - F14         
<esc>[12~   - F2          <esc>[27~   -             
<esc>[13~   - F3          <esc>[28~   - F15         
<esc>[14~   - F4          <esc>[29~   - F16         
<esc>[15~   - F5          <esc>[30~   -

xterm sequences:
<esc>[A     - Up          <esc>[K     -             <esc>[U     -
<esc>[B     - Down        <esc>[L     -             <esc>[V     -
<esc>[C     - Right       <esc>[M     -             <esc>[W     -
<esc>[D     - Left        <esc>[N     -             <esc>[X     -
<esc>[E     -             <esc>[O     -             <esc>[Y     -
<esc>[F     - End         <esc>[1P    - F1          <esc>[Z     -
<esc>[G     - Keypad 5    <esc>[1Q    - F2       
<esc>[H     - Home        <esc>[1R    - F3       
<esc>[I     -             <esc>[1S    - F4       
<esc>[J     -             <esc>[T     - 

<esc>[A to <esc>[D are the same as the ANSI output sequences. (draft section)

Xterm has a comprehensive documentation page on the various function-key and mouse input sequence schemes from DEC's VT terminals and various other terminals it emulates. Thomas Dickey has added a lot of support to it over time; he also maintains a list of default keys used by other terminal emulators for comparison.

 On the Linux console, certain function keys generate sequences of the form CSI [ char. The CSI sequence should terminate on the [.
 Old versions of Terminator generate SS3 1; modifiers char when  are pressed with modifiers. The faulty behavior was copied from GNOME Terminal.
 xterm replies CSI row ; column R if asked for cursor position and CSI 1 ; modifiers R if the  key is pressed with modifiers, which collide in the case of row == 1. This can be avoided by using the ? private modifier as CSI ? 6 n, which will be reflected in the response as CSI ? row ; column R.
 many terminals prepend ESC to any character that is typed with the alt key down. This creates ambiguity for uppercase letters and symbols @[\]^_, which would form C1 codes.
 Konsole generates SS3 modifiers char when  are pressed with modifiers.

See also 
 ANSI art
 Control character
 Advanced Video Attribute Terminal Assembler and Recreator (AVATAR)
 ISO/IEC JTC 1/SC 2
 C0 and C1 control codes

Notes

References

External links 
 Standard ECMA-48, Control Functions For Coded Character Sets. (5th edition, June 1991), European Computer Manufacturers Association, Geneva 1991 (also published by ISO and IEC as standard ISO/IEC 6429)
 vt100.net DEC Documents
 
 Xterm / Escape Sequences
 AIXterm / Escape Sequences
 A collection of escape sequences for terminals that are vaguely compliant with ECMA-48 and friends.
 
 ITU-T Rec. T.416 (03/93) Information technology – Open Document Architecture (ODA) and interchange format: Character content architectures

Computer standards
Ecma standards
American National Standards Institute standards
ISO standards
Text user interface